Arresting is a small rural village in the Kelheim district of Lower Bavaria, first mentioned in 1086. It is situated about 7 km north of Neustadt an der Donau, on the left bank of the Danube. 
There are some 130 inhabitants.

Villages in Bavaria